Red Glove is the 2011 second book in The Curse Workers, a series about Cassel Sharpe written by Holly Black. The novel was a finalist for the 2011 Cybils Award for Young Adult Fantasy and Science Fiction.

Reception 
Red Glove received a starred review from Publishers Weekly, who called the novel "smart and well-executed." Kirkus Reviews called the novel a "dark, disturbing fare, crafted by a master."

Locus include Red Glove on their "2011 Recommended Reading List" list for young adult novels. The novel was also a finalist for the 2011 Cybils Award for Young Adult Fantasy and Science Fiction.

References

External links 
 

2011 American novels
Novels by Holly Black
Margaret K. McElderry books

Novels set in New Jersey